Khaled "Kiko" Mouelhi (born 13 February 1981 in Tunis) is a retired Tunisian footballer and current manager.

International career
Mouelhi was a member of the Tunisian 2004 Olympic football team, which exited in the first round. The squad finished third in group C, behind group and gold medal winners Argentina and runners-up Australia.

Coaching career
On 2 April 2015, Mouelhi was appointed as the sporting director of Espérance de Tunis. In the August 2015, he changes position to assistant manager under manager Ammar Souayah.

On 30 September 2016, he was then appointed as the manager of EO Sidi Bouzid. Already on 10 December 2016, he decided to resign after poor results.

On 7 December 2018, Mouelhi was announced as the manager of JS Kairouan. He resigned on 19 February 2019.

Career statistics

Honours
Lillestrøm: 2007 Norwegian Football Cup

References

External links

1981 births
Living people
Tunisian footballers
Club Africain players
Lillestrøm SK players
Espérance Sportive de Tunis players
Footballers at the 2004 Summer Olympics
Olympic footballers of Tunisia
2013 Africa Cup of Nations players
Tunisia international footballers
Tunisian expatriate footballers
Expatriate footballers in Norway
Tunisian expatriate sportspeople in Norway
Eliteserien players
Association football midfielders
Tunisian football managers
EO Sidi Bouzid managers
JS Kairouan managers